Invasive species of earthworms from the suborder Lumbricina have been expanding their range in North America. Their introduction can have marked effects on the nutrient cycles in temperate forests. These earthworms increase the cycling and leaching of nutrients by breaking up decaying organic matter and spreading it into the soil. Since plants native to these northern forests are evolutionarily adapted to the presence of thick layers of decaying organic matter, the introduction of worms can lead to loss of biodiversity as young plants face less nutrient-rich conditions. Some species of trees and other plants may be incapable of surviving such changes in available nutrients.  This change in the plant diversity in turn affects other organisms and often leads to increased invasions of other exotic species as well as overall forest decline. They do not require a mate to reproduce, allowing them to spread faster.

Earthworms and range shifts 
Earthworms are shifting their ranges northwards into forests between 45° and 69° latitude in North America that have lacked native earthworms since the last ice age. The worms in question are primary engineers of their environment. They are considered keystone species because, as detritivores, they alter many different variables of their ecosystem.  Of the 182 taxa of earthworms found in the United States and Canada, 60 (33%) are introduced species. Among these, Lumbricus terrestris, L. rubellus, L. friendi, Amynthas agrestis, and Dendrobaena octaedra have been studied for their ability to invade previously uninhabited locations and disturb the local ecosystems. These earthworm species are primarily from Europe and Asia, and they are disturbing  many nutrient cycles. By redistributing nutrients, mixing soil layers, and creating pores in the soil, they can affect the characteristics of the soil important to the rest of the ecosystem. Earthworms break up decomposing matter on the surface of the soil and carry or mix it into the surrounding soil, often carrying some of the nutrients deeper into the soil, where saplings and other young plants have trouble reaching them.

Influence on nutrient cycles and soil profiles
When organisms die, their remains fall to the forest floor, where they begin decomposing into their constituent nutrients. In the absence of efficient detritivores such as earthworms, a thick layer of such organic matter accumulates. Most northern forests in North America lack native earthworms, which were largely wiped out when the ice sheets of the Wisconsin glaciation scoured much of the continent down to the bedrock. A deep detritus layer is thus characteristic of the native ecosystem of the region, and many native plants have evolved to rely on it.  As it slowly decomposes, it supplies nutrients, particularly potassium, phosphorus, and nitrogen, that are necessary for the production of cellular components such as carbohydrates, nucleic acids, and proteins; these nutrients are often a limiting factor in growth and maturation. This provides for the growth of the trees, ferns, and smaller ground plants.

When earthworms are introduced into areas where they previously did not reside, the earthworms break up the organic layer. They often mix the nutrients into the soil, out of the reach of all but the deeper tree roots. Nutrients may then be leached and lost from the ecosystem entirely. Overall effects include a decrease in the thickness of the organic layer, increased mineralization, increased bulk density, spreading of the organic matter and humus, and increased rate of decomposition.  These environmental alterations (drier, brighter, less nutrient-rich soil) create changes to the ecosystem. Podzol soils lose their classic banded appearance when earthworms obliterate their eluvial (A2, Ae or E) horizons.

Effects on organisms
Without the nutrients available, some species that provide important biological niches to the ecosystem may be eradicated. In addition, young plants may be unable to grow without the surface nitrogen source provided by the layer of detritus.  Since young plants do not have the deep root systems that older trees have, they often cannot obtain enough nutrients to survive.  Thus, few saplings or under-canopy plants grow to full maturity and generally only the larger trees with extensive root systems survive. The addition of earthworms to an environment has been shown to decrease mycorrhizal associations with roots. This adds to the problem of finding available nutrients for plants.  Specifically, trees like poplar, birch, and maples are disfavored by the change in habitat, as are many forest herbs like Aralia, Viola, and Botrychium. These plants may be eradicated from the temperate forests after only months of the invasives' presence. Also, when a decrease in overall ground cover and canopy vegetation occurs, food for other organisms becomes scarce.  As a result, some organisms are forced to leave the areas, and the few plants remaining are often eaten shortly after germination.

With decreased ground-level vegetation, many terrestrial organisms like insects, small mammals, and other vertebrates must compete for fewer resources, leading to decreased diversity and population.  In addition, the native species of worms may be unable to compete with the introduced species because the native ones are not well adapted to the new conditions of the forest soil. Moreover, the decrease in plant biomass due to specie richness effects earthworms is directly related with trophic levels. The lower trophic levels are affected less than the higher trophic levels. 

Generally, with the addition of earthworms to a forest, a decrease in diversity is observed, and often other exotic species follow that can survive the nutrient diminished environment better than the natives. For example, in newly invaded forests buckthorn and garlic mustard, both invasive species, increase notably in population density.  To summarize, there is a decrease in diversity, seedling populations, forest floor organic matter volume, and overall habitat quality. In addition, there is often an increase in invasive species and decreased diversity of non-plant organisms.

Origins
Most of the invasive earthworms are European or Asian and came over in soil during the eighteenth century as Europeans began settling the North American continent. The worms were originally transferred through the horticultural trade, probably in the soil bulbs of European plants being carried to the Americas. The lack of competition from native earthworms allowed the invaders to flourish. Now recreational practices and construction methods are the primary mode of transportation for the earthworms.  Their movement in the soil is slow on their own, but with human transportation they can migrate much faster. The earthworms are commonly used as bait for fishing, and many escape or are released. In addition, many are moved physically in soil through construction practices; they are either moved in dirt loads from one location to another, or are trapped in dirt attached to wheels of larger trucks.  Some propose a major mode of transportation is through logging trucks, which move from location to location with large amounts of dirt attached to their wheels.

Certain characteristics of soil habitat may affect the ability of the earthworms to invade an environment. High salinity and sandy soils have greater resistance to earthworm spread.  Low pH and the presence of plant matter with a high carbon-to-nitrogen ratio (C:N) may promote resistance; conversely, high pH and low C:N ratios appear to confer greater susceptibility.

Asian earthworms 

In recent years, there has been a rising concern over the invasion of Asian pheretimoid earthworms in North America, particularly of the genera Amynthas and Metaphire.  These earthworms have a variety of nicknames due to their characteristic thrashing behavior, including "Asian jumping worms", "Alabama jumpers", "crazy worms", and "snake worms". The effects of invasive Asian earthworm species are much less documented than those of European lumbricid earthworms, but there is a greater concern over the potential effects of jumping worms on soil structure and chemistry, nutrient cycling, forest regeneration and animal and plant communities.  Evidence shows that Asian earthworms grow more rapidly, reproduce more quickly, and have greater flexibility in their diet than European species. They can also exist at higher densities than European earthworm species.  These characteristics may allow jumping worms to outcompete their European earthworm competitors.  These traits mean that jumping worms can consume organic matter more rapidly, stripping the forest floor of organic matter and temporarily flooding the system with nutrients.  Northeastern forests evolved under the slow decomposition and release of nutrients, and it is still unclear how forests are responding to the rapid breakdown of organic material.

Prevention

See also
Earthworms as invasive species

References

External links
Minnesota Department of Natural Resources: Earthworms
Invasive Worms in American Soil. All About Wildlife. (Posted: March 3, 2010)

Earthworms
Annelids